Mouncif El Haddaoui (born 21 October 1964) is a Moroccan football midfielder who played for Morocco in the 1986 FIFA World Cup. He also played for Association Salé.

References

External links
FIFA profile

1964 births
Living people
Moroccan footballers
Morocco international footballers
Association football midfielders
Association Salé players
Botola players
1986 African Cup of Nations players
1986 FIFA World Cup players